The Medal "30 years of the Victory in Khalkhin-Gol" (Mongolian: Халхын голын ялалтын 30 жилийн ойн медаль) was an award of the Mongolian People's Republic, instituted on 9 June 1969. It was awarded to Mongolians and foreigners for military and civil services. The Medal was in 1969, in honor of the 30th anniversary of the Battle of Khalkhin-Gol.

See also 
Hero of the Mongolian People's Republic
Order of Sukhbaatar
Medal "50 Years of the Mongolian People's Revolution"

Orders, decorations, and medals of Mongolia